Novi Community School District (NCSD) is a school district with its headquarters located in Novi, Michigan, USA in Greater Detroit. It operates eight schools.

The board of education includes a president, a vice president, a secretary, a treasurer, and four members. As of 2011 Dr. Steve Matthews is the district superintendent.

Its service area includes most of Novi and a small block of Wixom.

Rankings

NCSD is ranked as the #1 best school district in the state of Michigan on k12 Niche.
NCSD is consistently ranked in the top 20 school districts in the state of Michigan, in many rankings.

History
In 1990 the district began offering the "Here Comes the Bus System," an invention which alerts parents that the school bus is within  of the bus stop so that students do not have to wait for long periods of time at bus stops. Parents could pay $25 (about $ when adjusted for inflation) per year and a deposit in order to use the service. In the decade leading up to 2005, the school district's enrollment increased from 3,790 to 6,150 and the budget increased from $29 million (about $ when adjusted for inflation) to $60 million (about $ when adjusted for inflation). Around 2005 district administrators anticipated that newly established housing developments in northern and western Novi would add 1,600 houses to the district. In 2005 the school district proposed giving random drug tests to students involved in all extracurricular activities.

In 2010, the Japanese School of Detroit (JSD), a supplementary educational institution that offers Japanese classes on Saturdays, announced that it was relocating to Novi. It entered into a 10-year agreement with the school district and began to use Novi Meadows Elementary School to conduct classes. It moved in the northern hemisphere summer of 2011. Superintendent Steve Matthews said that he expected for the Japanese population in the school district to increase due to the move of JSD.

After the 2011 Tōhoku earthquake and tsunami occurred, the school district advised school staff to be sensitive to students who may have been affected by the disaster, as many of the district's students were Japanese or of Japanese descent.

Demographics

As of December 2010, the district has about 6,300 students. As of March 2011, of the student body, over 1,700 are Japanese American and Japanese national students. In December 2011 the district estimated that 5% of its students were Japanese nationals. As of 2015 Kazuyuki Katayama (片山 和之 Katayama Kazuyuki), the Japanese Consul General in Detroit, stated that he heard that there were 400 Japanese national students in the Novi school system.

Many parents of these students have jobs with automobile industry firms. Peter Dion, the superintendent, said in March 2011 that many of the Japanese students come to the Novi School District, attend the district for several years, and then move back to Japan. There are no full-time Japanese schools in Metro Detroit, so Japanese national students attend American schools.

Schools

NCSD owns and operates 8 schools, and is in the process of building its ninth.

High school

Novi High School serves students in grades 9–12. The current building was built in 1977 and has been expanded several times since then. Prior to 1968, the Novi Community School District did not have a high school of its own and high school students were bused to nearby Northville. It was awarded Blue Ribbon School status in 1986-87 and 1999-00. As of 2011 Novi High enrolls 2,020 students and has a faculty of over 150 employees.

Middle schools
Novi Meadows School is an upper elementary school, and serves grades 5 and 6. The northern half of the school was built in 1964 with an addition built on the west end of the building in 1968 and served as Novi High School from 1968-1977. Starting in the 1978-1979 school year it became Novi Middle School North. The southern part of the building was built in 1971 and initially housed grades 6-8 and served as Novi Middle school until 1978 when the 6th grade was moved over to Novi Middle School North. In 1978, Novi Middle School became known as Novi Middle School South. In the early 1990s, a tunnel was constructed linking the two buildings. The current principals are John Brickey, and Lisa Fenchel.
Novi Middle School serves grades 7 and 8. It serves 1056 students as of 2015. The school was built on an old horse farm at the intersection of Wixom and 11 Mile roads in 1998. Prior to that time, Novi Middle School was located in what is now the southern portion of the current Novi Meadows School. Milan Obrenovich, a former Novi Meadows principal served the Novi School District in an administrative capacity (principal, assistant principal) in the Novi Community School District since 1966, but retired in 2011. The current principal is Robert Baker.

Elementary schools
Deerfield Elementary School is located on Wixom Road on an old horse farm adjacent to Novi Middle School. The school opened its doors in 2000. There is currently 450 students enrolled. The current principal is Julie Bedford.
Novi Woods Elementary School was built in 1976 to replace the old Novi Elementary School on Novi Road where the Novi Town Center Shopping area is today. This school is an open classroom type that was pioneered in Michigan in the early-1970s. David Ascher is the current principal of the school. The school currently has about 500 students attending.
Orchard Hills Elementary School was built in 1958 and is currently the oldest school in the district. The school is located on Quince Drive in the Orchard Hills subdivision. The current principal is Pam Quitiquit. It has an Enrollment of approximately 430 students.
Parkview Elementary School was built and opened in 1989 and served grades K-4. Student enrollment is more than 550 students. The building received numerous accolades for its unique design upon opening. The current principal is Laura Carino.
Village Oaks Elementary School serves grades K-4. The school was built in 1971 and is located on Willowbrook Drive in the Village Oaks subdivision.  Student enrollment is more than 600 students. Village Oaks was named a National Blue Ribbon Exemplary School in 2018. The current principal is Dr. Alex Ofili.

Preschools
Early Childhood Education Center is on Taft Road by Novi Meadows School. The approximate 39,000 sq foot building features 18 classrooms, 1 CARE room, cafeteria, multi purpose room, community education and Early childhood offices, and a capacity for 350 students. It was scheduled to open in August 2016.

References

External links

 
 School district map - By Shively, J. Michigan Center for Geographic Information Department of Information Technology. March 2008. Alternate map image

School districts in Michigan
Novi, Michigan
Education in Oakland County, Michigan